Justin Sweeney (born 25 December 1987) is an Australian rules footballer in the Australian Football League.

He was recruited as the number 71 draft pick in the 2005 AFL Draft from Tyabb. He made his debut in round 8 of 2007 against Hawthorn at the MCG in slippery conditions. Sweeney was a marking half-forward who was a prominent goalkicker in the VFL.

External links

1987 births
Living people
Australian rules footballers from Victoria (Australia)
St Kilda Football Club players